Chu-Bu and Sheemish are characters in a short story of the same name by Lord Dunsany. The tale was first published in The Book of Wonder (1912).

Plot summary
An unnamed narrator tells the following story: Chu-Bu is the accustomed resident in a temple where he is worshipped. Sheemish is a freshly carved idol added to the same temple one day—and from that moment the two deities become jealous, taunt each other and attempt to outdo the other in achieving miracles. Eventually their combined efforts result in a minor earthquake which destroys the temple. Their worshippers each claim their preferred god has caused the earthquake, but all of them stay away and do not rebuild the temple out of fear of such powerful gods. The narrator remarks that he found the demolished, abandoned temple one day and that Sheemish had been smashed but Chu-bu was intact, found on his back with his hands and feet in the air. The narrator brought Chu-bu home, keeps him in that same position on his mantle, and every so often will offer token worship to Chu-bu to keep the god's spirits up.

References

External links
Text of "Chu-Bu and Sheemish"
 

Short stories by Edward Plunkett, 18th Baron of Dunsany
1912 short stories